Podunk is a hard rock band that formed in Port Arthur, Texas in 1992, soon thereafter establishing themselves on the scene in Austin, Texas. Similar to AC/DC and The Black Crowes in style, Podunk performed at South by Southwest in the mid-1990s and subsequently. Their CD Throwin' Bones, released in 1998, was re-released nationally by Matchbox Records in 2000, and the track "Wings" saw airplay nationwide. Podunk's songs have appeared on several of KLBJ's Local Licks Live series of recordings. They opened for Tesla on some tour dates in 2004. They have also opened nationwide for King's X. The band has enjoyed a number of positive reviews in US press outlets.

Members
Current members
Jason Touchette – guitar, lead vocals
Duncan Isenhower – guitar, vocals
Paul Soroski – bass guitar
Brian Hays – drums
Former members
Bryan Jones - guitar, background vocals
Dwight Baker- drums, percussion

Discography
Breech (1995)
Murlin's Dock (1996)
Throwin' Bones (1998)
Podunk (2002)
The Vault (2013)

See also
Music of Austin

References

External links
Official Website (Down as of 5/2006)
Fansite

Musical groups from Austin, Texas
Musical groups established in 1992
1992 establishments in Texas